Geneva Accord may refer to:

 Geneva Statement on Ukraine, an agreement to de-escalate the 2014 pro-Russian unrest in Ukraine
 Geneva interim agreement on Iranian nuclear program, an interim agreement on Iranian nuclear program between the P5+1 and Iran
 Geneva Initiative (2003), a peace plan in the Israeli-Palestinian conflict also referred to as the Geneva Accord
 Geneva Accord (1991), a peace plan in the Croatian War of Independence
 Geneva Accords (1988), a settlement that concerned Afghanistan
 Geneva Accords (1954), a plan concerning Indochina and Vietnam
 German-Polish Accord on East Silesia (Geneva Accord 1922), a bilateral treaty between Germany and Poland on the division of Silesia

See also
 Geneva Conventions
 Geneva Conference